Dasineura fraxini is a gall midge which forms galls on the leaves of ash (Fraxinus species). It was first described by Johann Jacob Bremi-Wolf in 1847.

Appearance of the gall
Most of the gall is on the underside of the main vein, where it forms a narrow green pouch. There can be several on a leaf, ranging in size from 5 mm to 30 mm, although they can coalesce. Each contains an orange larva. There is a slit-like opening on the upperside of the leaf. The galls can be found from June to October and can also be found on the petiole and rachis. It is found on Fraxinus angustifolia & subsp., F. excelsior, F. ornus and F. oxycarpa.

Inquiline
The larvae of Clinodiplosis botularia are reddish-yellow and outcompete the gall maker, which perish.

Distribution
The insect is found in Europe.

References

Cecidomyiinae
Gall-inducing insects
Insects described in 1847
Nematoceran flies of Europe
Taxa named by Johann Jacob Bremi-Wolf